The Temple Beth-El is a Jewish synagogue in Casablanca, Morocco. While the city boasts more than 30 synagogues, Beth-El is often considered the center piece of a once vibrant Jewish community. Its stained glass windows and other artistic elements, is what attracts tourists to this synagogue. The temple was completely refurbished in 1997.

References

Jews and Judaism in Casablanca
Orthodox Judaism in North Africa
Orthodox synagogues
Religious buildings and structures in Casablanca
Sephardi synagogues
Synagogues in Morocco
Tourist attractions in Casablanca